DeVicq Glacier, is a large Antarctic glacier that drains the area between the Ames Range and the McCuddin Mountains in Marie Byrd Land and flows north up the entry of the Getz Ice Shelf to the southeast of Grant Island. It was mapped by the U.S. Geological Survey from surveys and U.S. Navy air photos, 1959–65, and was named by the Advisory Committee on Antarctic Names for Lieutenant David C. DeVicq, U.S. Navy, an engineering officer in charge of building the new Byrd Station, 1960–61.

See also
 List of glaciers in the Antarctic
 List of Antarctic ice streams
 Glaciology

References 

Ice streams of Marie Byrd Land